The George R. Moscone Convention Center (pronounced ), popularly known as the Moscone Center, is the largest convention and exhibition complex in San Francisco, California. The convention center originally opened in 1981. It is named after San Francisco former mayor George Moscone, who was assassinated in November 1978.

History

The South of Market Area where Moscone Center was built was claimed by the San Francisco Redevelopment Agency, and a protracted battle was fought by the displaced low-income residents during the 1960s and 1970s.

Although the center is named after the murdered mayor, Moscone initially opposed the development of the area when he served on the SF Board of Supervisors in the 1960s because he felt it would displace elderly and poor residents of the area. As mayor, Moscone convened a special committee of proponents and opponents of a convention center. Hearings were held throughout SF seeking citizen input. A compromise was reached which was supported by Moscone. He put the matter on the ballot in November 1976 and it passed overwhelmingly.

The original Moscone Convention Center hall opened in 1981 on the site of what is now known as Moscone South. It was designed by a team at Hellmuth, Obata & Kassabaum led by Bill Valentine. The exhibition hall was placed underground to minimize the controversial convention center's visible footprint.

Moscone Center was featured in the 1995 movie The Net, with Sandra Bullock.

The expansion of Moscone North and Moscone West in 1992 and 2003, designed by Gensler with Hunt Construction Group as the general contractor, added an additional  to its original  of exhibit space.

Moscone North and South underwent a two-year renovation project that was completed in 2012. The renewal project was designed by HOK, the center's original architect. A $ expansion project is underway, which was scheduled for completion in December 2018. The aboveground portions of Moscone South have been demolished and replaced by a more spacious structure. Moscone North was also renovated. The expansion project was designed by Skidmore, Owings & Merrill in collaboration with Mark Cavagnero Associates.

Facilities
The Moscone Center complex consists of three main halls:

 Moscone South is located to the south of Howard Street. It is three stories tall. It opened in 2017, replacing the original Moscone Center building that opened in 1981. A Keith Haring sculpture stands outside the hall at the corner of 3rd and Howard streets.
 Moscone North is located to the north of Howard Street.
 Moscone West is a three-level exhibition hall located across 4th Street from Moscone North.

Moscone North and South are connected by a pedestrian bridge over Howard Street, as well as by the underground exhibition hall, which extends far beyond the aboveground structures and beneath Yerba Buena Gardens and the Metreon entertainment center. The massive underground hall has been described as a bunker.

A large solar electricity system was installed on the roof of the center in March 2004 by PowerLight Corporation. The installation of this system marked San Francisco's first major step towards obtaining all municipal energy from pollution-free sources. With the  solar array (675 kW capacity) in place, San Francisco boasts one of the largest city-owned solar installations in the country. The electricity generated by the solar system, combined with savings from energy efficiency measures, delivers the equivalent energy to power approximately 8,500 homes.

The location of the complex in the South of Market area provides easy access to downtown San Francisco's many hotels and restaurants, as well as major transportation systems. The center is two blocks away from the Powell Street station, which is served by both BART and Muni Metro. When complete, the Yerba Buena/Moscone station will also bring Muni Metro service to the southwestern corner of the convention center complex and provide connectivity with Caltrain. An Amtrak Thruway Motorcoach stop at Moscone Center (station code SFM) also transports riders to the Emeryville Amtrak station along the Capitol Corridor line.

Labor organizations supported the construction of the center, and were granted full labor jurisdiction. All labor in the Convention Center is performed by I.A.T.S.E. Local 16 Stagehands, Sign and Display Workers Local #510, Brotherhood of Teamsters local #65, IBEW Local #6, Security I.A.T.S.E. Local #B-18, Communications Workers of America, and the Hotel & Restaurant Workers Local #2. IUOE Local #39 provides Engineering Services.
Projection Presentation Technology is the on-site rental service.

Events
Moscone Center hosts many large events each year. During the 2016–17 season, Moscone Center hosted 74 events with a total attendance of 1,021,031.

Moscone Center hosts a number of annual professional gatherings, including:

 American Bar Association annual meeting
 Dreamforce (since 2005)
 Game Developers Conference (2005, since 2007)
 Oracle OpenWorld (since 1997)
 Pacific Coast Builders Conference
 RSA Conference (2001, 2003–2005, since 2007)
 SEMICON West (since 1992)
 Winter Fancy Food Show
 SPIE Photonics West

In addition, Moscone Center hosts public gated events such as the SF Auto Show and the Fancy Foods Show.

Moscone Center formerly hosted the following annual events:

 American Geophysical Union fall meeting (until 2016)
 Apple Worldwide Developers Conference (2003–2016)
 Google I/O (2008–2015)
 JavaOne (1997–2009, 2017)
 Macworld/iWorld (1985–2014)
 Microsoft Build (2013–2016)
 VMworld (2007, 2009, 2010, 2012–2015, 2019)
 West Coast Computer Faire (1984–1991)
 WonderCon (2003–2011)
 Intel Developer Forum (2002–2016)

Other notable events at the convention center have included:

 1984 Democratic National Convention, at which the Democratic Party nominated Walter Mondale for President of the United States and Geraldine Ferraro for Vice President, marking the first time a woman had been nominated by a major party for either office
 1987 National Sports Collectors Convention
 1992 and 1996 Microsoft Professional Developers Conference
 1993 World Science Fiction Convention
 2000 President Bill Clinton spoke in the Esplanade Ballroom and recorded a weekly radio address in the Green Room
 2009 OpenSource World
 2015 TwitchCon
 2015 PlayStation Experience
 2015 Capcom Cup
 2016 NFL Experience
 2016 North American International Auto Show
 2017 GMSA Mobile World Congress Americas

See also

Bill Graham Civic Auditorium
49-Mile Scenic Drive
Roger Boas
List of convention centers in the United States

References

External links

 Moscone Center official website
Moscone Convention Center Interactive Map
  Moscone Center Solar Power data analysis
 Information about the solar installation on the roof of Moscone Center
 Things to do in and near Moscone Center
 Moscone Center Visitors Guide
 Museum Parc Garage - nearby parking for visitors for Moscone

Landmarks in San Francisco
Buildings and structures in San Francisco
Convention centers in California
Buildings and structures completed in 1981
Event venues established in 1981
Buildings and structures completed in 1992
Buildings and structures completed in 2003
South of Market, San Francisco
HOK (firm) buildings
Gensler buildings